Takahe Nunatak is the northern of two similar nunataks that lie 0.3 nautical miles (0.6 km) apart and 3.3 nautical miles (6 km) north-northeast of Mount Bird in northwest Ross Island. It rises to c.1100 m and, like Kakapo Nunatak is one of several features near Mount Bird assigned the native name of a New Zealand mountain bird. Named by New Zealand Geographic Board (NZGB), 2000.

Nunataks of Ross Island